Orbit Science Fiction was an American  science fiction magazine anthology published in 1953 and 1954 by the Hanro Corporation.  Only 5 issues were published, each of which were edited by Donald A. Wollheim, although Jules Saltman was credited within the publication.  Several prominent science fiction writers published short stories within Orbit, including Philip K. Dick, Donald A. Wollheim, and Michael Shaara.  Each issue was published as a digest, and originally sold for $0.35.

List of issues
Orbit Science Fiction No.1, September 1953, 132pp.
Orbit Science Fiction No.2, December 1953, 132pp.
Orbit Science Fiction No.3, July–August 1954, Jul 1954, 132pp.
Orbit Science Fiction No.4 September–October 1954, Sep 1954, 132pp.
Orbit Science Fiction No.5, November–December 1954, Nov 1954, 132pp.

See also

 List of defunct American periodicals

External links
 
 

Defunct science fiction magazines published in the United States
Magazines established in 1953
Magazines disestablished in 1954
Science fiction magazines established in the 1950s
Pulp series pop
Irregularly published magazines published in the United States
Bimonthly magazines published in the United States